Saat Paake Bandha is an India and Bengali-language television soap opera that  premiered on 5 July 2010, and  aired on Bengali Zee Bangla. The show  starred Oindrila Sen and Vikram Chatterjee in lead roles.

Cast
 Oindrila Sen as Dustu 
 Vikram Chatterjee as Raja (before surgery)
 Vivaan Ghosh as Raja / fake Rohan (after surgery)

Recurring
 Rita Koiral as Charu: Shidu, Dipu, Rumi, Munni and Raja's mother
 Partha Sarathi Deb as Shidu, Dipu, Rumi, Munni and Raja's father
 Baisakhi Marjit as Sudeshna: Abhirup's second wife and Dustu's mother
 Santu Mukherjee / Rohit Mukherjee as Abhirup: Sudeshna's husband, Aranya and Dustu's father
 Saswati Guha Thakurta as Abhirup's first wife and Aranya's mother
 Subhrajit Dutta as Aranya: Abhirup's son and Dustu's step-brother 
 Manasi Sinha / Namita Chakraborty as Manu: Dustu's caretaker
 Debottam Majumdar as Apu: Dustu's former fiancé
 Sandip Chakraborty as Shidu: Raja's brother
 Lopamudra Sinha as Kakoli: Shidu's wife
 Sahana Sen as Rumi: Raja's sister
 Lovely Maitra as Munni: Raja's sister
 Animesh Bhaduri as Dipu: Raja's brother
 Anindita Sarkar / Piyali Basu as Bisaka: Dipu's wife
 YourPritam as raja
 Subho Roy Chowdhury / Sudip Sarkar as Shubo: Munni's husband
 Indrakshi Nag as Megha
 Rumki Chatterjee as Megha's mother
 Prantik Banerjee as Anik / Rohan
 Moumita Gupta as Domoyonti Sen
 Kaushik Banerjee as Domoyonti's husband 
 Priya Paul / Sneha Chatterjee as Juiee
 Ambarish Bhattacharya as Bubai
 Rupsa Chatterjee / Sarmistha Acharjee as Rupsha
 Chandraniv Mukherjee as Vijeet
 Debaparna Chakraborty as Tushi
 Manishankar Banerjee as Raja and Apu's maternal uncle

References

Zee Bangla original programming
Bengali-language television programming in India
2010 Indian television series debuts